Paul Herget (January 30, 1908 – August 27, 1981) was an American astronomer and director of the Cincinnati Observatory, who established the Minor Planet Center after World War II.

Career 
Herget taught astronomy at the University of Cincinnati. He was a pioneer in the use of machine methods, and eventually digital computers, in the solving of scientific and specifically astronomical problems (for example, in the calculation of ephemeris tables for minor planets). 

During World War II he applied these same talents to the war effort, helping to locate U-boats by means of the application of spherical trigonometry.

Herget established the Minor Planet Center at the university after the war in 1947. He was also named director of the Cincinnati Observatory. The Minor Planet Center was eventually relocated in 1978 to the Smithsonian Astrophysical Observatory in Cambridge, Massachusetts, where it still operates.

Awards and honors 
 In 1965 he was awarded the James Craig Watson Medal by the National Academy of Sciences for, "his scientific accomplishments in celestial mechanics and orbit computation, and particularly for his contributions to the knowledge of the orbits of asteroids".
 Asteroid 1751 Herget, discovered by astronomers with the Indiana Asteroid Program at Goethe Link Observatory in 1955, was named in his honor. The official  was published by the Minor Planet Center on February 20, 1971.

Publication of discovery circumstances 

In the 1950s and 1960s, Paul Herget compiled a large number of naming citations for minor planets, giving the discovery circumstances as well as background information on the name's origin and on the involved astronomers. His collected work is known as The Names of the Minor Planets and was published by the Cincinnati Observatory in 1955 and 1968. The last publication contains details of the discovery and naming of 1,564 minor planets up to the height of WWII in 1943, and spans from the first discovered minor planet, 1 Ceres, up to 1564 Srbija. Herget's discovery circumstances were later incorporated into the Dictionary of Minor Planet Names, which was prepared by astronomer Lutz Schmadel on behalf of IAU's commission 20. In this work, citations that origin from Herget's original compilation are marked with the letter "H" and the corresponding page number.

See also 
 Meanings of minor planet names

References

External links 
 PaulHerget.org
 Paul Herget at Columbia University Computing History
 Lecture by Paul Herget on the history of the Cincinnati Observatory
 Paul Herget 1908 - 1981. A Biographical Memoir by Donald E. Ostertbrock and P. Kenneth Seidelmann National Academy of Sciences)

1908 births
1981 deaths
American astronomers
Members of the United States National Academy of Sciences
University of Cincinnati alumni
University of Cincinnati faculty